Île de l'Est, or East Island, is a part of the subantarctic archipelago of the Crozet Islands. With an area of  it is the second largest island of the group. It is part of the French Southern and Antarctic Lands.

Description
The island is the easternmost of the archipelago, lying about 20 km east of Île de la Possession (Possession Island).  The landscape is mainly bare rock; it is the most mountainous in the archipelago, with a high point of 1090 m, and a rugged coastline of high cliffs.  It is dissected by several steep-sided valleys of glacial origin.  The only introduced animals are rabbits.  There is no human infrastructure; it is only occasionally visited by researchers.

Important Bird Area
The island has been identified as an Important Bird Area (IBA) by BirdLife International as a breeding site for seabirds.  Key species include king, gentoo, macaroni and northern rockhopper penguins, wandering, grey-headed, light-mantled, sooty and black-browed albatrosses, both northern and southern giant petrels, medium-billed and fairy prions, great-winged, soft-plumaged, white-chinned, grey, blue and Kerguelen petrels, Wilson's, grey-backed and black-bellied storm petrels, common and South Georgia diving petrels, Crozet blue-eyed shags, brown skuas and Kerguelen terns.  Eaton's pintails are present.  The island is also the site of the largest breeding population of southern elephant seals in the archipelago.

See also
 List of Antarctic islands north of 60° S

References

Important Bird Areas of the Crozet Islands
Volcanoes of the French Southern and Antarctic Lands
Est
Seabird colonies
Penguin colonies